In eukaryote cells, RNA polymerase III (also called Pol III) is a protein that transcribes DNA to synthesize 5S ribosomal RNA, tRNA and other small RNAs.

The genes transcribed by RNA Pol III fall in the category of "housekeeping" genes whose expression is required in all cell types and most environmental conditions.  Therefore, the regulation of Pol III transcription is primarily tied to the regulation of cell growth and the cell cycle, and thus requires fewer regulatory proteins than RNA polymerase II. Under stress conditions however, the protein Maf1 represses Pol III activity. Rapamycin is another Pol III inhibitor via its direct target TOR.

Transcription 
The process of transcription (by any polymerase) involves three main stages:
Initiation, requiring construction of the RNA polymerase complex on the gene's promoter
Elongation, the synthesis of the RNA transcript
Termination, the finishing of RNA transcription and disassembly of the RNA polymerase complex

Initiation
Initiation: the construction of the polymerase complex on the promoter. Pol III is unusual (compared to Pol II) by requiring no control sequences upstream of the gene, instead normally relying on internal control sequences - sequences within the transcribed section of the gene (although upstream sequences are occasionally seen, e.g. U6 snRNA gene has an upstream TATA box as seen in Pol II Promoters).

There are three classes of Pol III initiation, corresponding to 5S rRNA, tRNA, and U6 snRNA initiation. In all cases, the process starts with transcription factors binding to control sequences, and ends with TFIIIB (Transcription Factor for polymerase III B) being recruited to the complex and assembling Pol III. TFIIIB consists of three subunits: TATA binding protein (TBP), a TFIIB-related factor (BRF1, or BRF2 for transcription of a subset of Pol III-transcribed genes in vertebrates), and a B-double-prime (BDP1) unit. The overall architecture bears similarities to that of Pol II.

Class I
Typical stages in 5S rRNA (also termed class I) gene initiation:
TFIIIA (Transcription Factor for polymerase III A) binds to the intragenic (lying within the transcribed DNA sequence) 5S rRNA control sequence, the C Block (also termed box C).
TFIIIA serves as a platform that replaces the A and B Blocks for positioning TFIIIC in an orientation with respect to the start site of transcription that is equivalent to what is observed for tRNA genes.
Once TFIIIC is bound to the TFIIIA-DNA complex, the assembly of TFIIIB proceeds as described for tRNA transcription.

Class II
Typical stages in a tRNA (also termed class II) gene initiation:
TFIIIC (Transcription Factor for polymerase III C) binds to two intragenic (lying within the transcribed DNA sequence) control sequences, the A and B Blocks (also termed box A and box B).
TFIIIC acts as an assembly factor that positions TFIIIB to bind to DNA at a site centered approximately 26 base pairs upstream of the start site of transcription.
TFIIIB is the transcription factor that assembles Pol III at the start site of transcription.  Once TFIIIB is bound to DNA, TFIIIC is no longer required.  TFIIIB also plays an essential role in promoter opening.

Class III
Typical stages in a U6 snRNA (also termed class III) gene initiation (documented in vertebrates only):
SNAPc (SNRNA Activating Protein complex; subunits: 1, 2, 3, 4, 5) (also termed PBP and PTF) binds to the PSE (Proximal Sequence Element) centered approximately 55 base pairs upstream of the start site of transcription.  This assembly is greatly stimulated by the Pol II transcription factors Oct1 and STAF that bind to an enhancer-like DSE (Distal Sequence Element) at least 200 base pairs upstream of the start site of transcription.  These factors and promoter elements are shared between Pol II and Pol III transcription of snRNA genes.
SNAPc acts to assemble TFIIIB at a TATA box centered 26 base pairs upstream of the start site of transcription.  It is the presence of a TATA box that specifies that the snRNA gene is transcribed by Pol III rather than Pol II.
The TFIIIB for U6 snRNA transcription contains a smaller Brf1 paralogue, Brf2.
TFIIIB is the transcription factor that assembles Pol III at the start site of transcription.  Sequence conservation predicts that TFIIIB containing Brf2 also plays a role in promoter opening.

Elongation 
TFIIIB remains bound to DNA following initiation of transcription by Pol III (unlike bacterial σ factors and most of the basal transcription factors for Pol II transcription).  This leads to a high rate of transcriptional reinitiation of Pol III-transcribed genes.

Termination
Polymerase III terminates transcription at small polyUs stretch (5-6). In eukaryotes, a hairpin loop is not required, but may enhance termination efficiency in humans.

Transcribed RNAs
The types of RNAs transcribed from RNA polymerase III include:
Transfer RNAs
5S ribosomal RNA
U6 spliceosomal RNA
RNase P and RNase MRP RNA
7SL RNA (the RNA component of the signal recognition particle)
Vault RNAs
Y RNA
SINEs (short interspersed repetitive elements)
7SK RNA
Several microRNAs
Several small nucleolar RNAs
Several gene regulatory antisense RNAs

Role in DNA repair

RNA polymerase III appears to be essential for homologous recombinational repair of DNA double-strand breaks.  RNA polymerase III catalyzes formation of a transient RNA-DNA hybrid at double strand breaks, an essential intermediate step in homologous recombination mediated double-strand break repair. This step protects the 3’ overhanging DNA strand from degradation.  After the transient RNA-DNA hybrid intermediate is formed the RNA strand is replaced by the RAD51 protein which then catalyzes the  ssDNA invasion step of homologous recombination.

See also
RNA polymerase

References

Gene expression
Proteins